Brackett is a surname. Notable people with the surname include:
 Anna Brackett (1836–1911), American philosopher, translator, and educator
 Bert Brackett (born 1944) American politician
 Brett Brackett, American football player
 Bruce Godfrey Brackett (1915–1943), American naval aviator
 Charles Brackett (1892–1969), American screenwriter and producer
 Chris Brackett, archer
 Deke Brackett (1911–1970), college football player and coach
 Edgar T. Brackett (1853–1924), American lawyer and politician
 Edward Augustus Brackett (1818–1908) American sculptor, poet, and conservationist
 Elizabeth Brackett (1941–2018), Chicago-based correspondent and TV host
 Frank Parkhurst Brackett (1865–1951), American professor of astronomy
 Frederick Sumner Brackett (1896–1988), American physicist and spectroscopist
 Gary Brackett (born 1980), American football player
 John Q. A. Brackett (1842–1918), Governor of Massachusetts, 1890-91
 Joseph Brackett (1797–1882), American songwriter
 Leigh Brackett (1915–1978), American novelist and screenwriter
 Marc Brackett, director of the Yale Center for Emotional Intelligence
 Sarah Brackett, American/Scottish actress
 Sean Brackett, American football player
 Walter M. Brackett (1823–1919), American painter
 Ward Brackett (1914–2006), American book and magazine artist